This is a list of volcanoes in Ethiopia. It includes both active and extinct vents.

See also 
 Geography of Ethiopia
 Lists of volcanoes

References 

Volcanoes
Ethiopia